The Louvre Castle, also known as the Medieval Louvre , was a castle built by King Philip II of France on the right bank of the Seine, to reinforce the city wall he had built around Paris. It was demolished in stages between 1528 and 1660 to make way for the expanded Louvre Palace.

History

Fortress

Before his departure for the Third Crusade in 1190, King Philip II wanted to protect his capital Paris against invasions, especially from English-held Normandy less than 100 km away, with memories still lingering of the Viking siege of Paris in 845. He ordered the construction of a new city wall, known since as the Wall of Philip II Augustus, which was started in 1190 on the right bank. The fortress was nearly squared in plan (78 m by 72 m), surrounded by a 10 m wide moat filled with water from the nearby Seine river. It was reinforced by ten defensive towers, on the corners and at the middle of each side, with twin towers defending narrow gates on the southern and eastern sides, protected by drawbridges. Two additional buildings housing the garrisons and the arsenals were located outside of the surrounding wall, to the west and south of the central courtyard, respectively.

A keep named the "big tower" was built around 1200 in the center of the courtyard. It was a circular structure with a diameter of 15.6 m and 30 m tall, with walls 4.25 m thick at the base. It was surrounded by a ditch, 9 m wide and 6 m deep. This ditch was dry (not a water-filled moat) and paved with large irregular stones. It was crossed by a drawbridge, whose interior arch was built in stone to limit the risk of fire. The keep had a conical roof slate over the machicolation. It also had a well and a large tank for supporting long sieges, as well as a chapel inside. The choice of a round rather than squared or rectangular keep was for military reasons, because attackers could more easily sap the wall at the angles of squared towers compared to circular towers.

Royal residence

The Louvre evolved gradually away from its initial purely military function. The Louvre became a residence intermittently during the troubled times of the 14th century. By the mid-14th century, Paris had grown well beyond the walls of Philip II. Étienne Marcel had started building a new city wall further to the west, which King Charles V (1364-1380) brought to completion, later known as the Wall of Charles V. Soon after becoming king, Charles initiated a major transformation of the Louvre into a prestigious royal residence. His architect  added upper floors, windows, turrets, sculpted decoration, and gardens.

During the Hundred Years' War, English soldiers commanded by Henry V of England, who was allied to the Burgundians who controlled Paris, entered the city. In December 1420, the English occupied the Louvre Castle without a fight. There, they found a Paris ruined by civil war and scarcity and stayed there until 1436.

Demolition and rebuilding

In 1525, Francis I of France was defeated in Pavia and held prisoner. During his captivity, the court interfered with the king's decisions using its droit de remontrance (right of remonstrance in French). In addition, the faculty of theology and the Parliament of Paris started to show some independence. The king held a lit de justice on 24, 26 and 27 July 1526, during which he demonstrated his authority and decided to take back his kingdom and make the Louvre castle his main residence in Paris. As a symbol of his authority, he ordered the demolition of the dungeon in 1528 in order to build an Italian style palace. In 1546, he charged the architect Pierre Lescot to build a modern palace in the spirit of the Renaissance architecture, with a large hôtel particulier and ceremonial rooms. After the death of Francis in 1547, his son Henry II of France continued the work by Pierre Lescot. Between December 1546 and March 1549, he had the west wall destroyed to build a ballroom and the south wall to erect the royal pavilion (1553–1556), which housed the royal apartments and the small gallery.

After the death of Henry II, his widow Catherine de' Medici continued the development of the south wing for her apartments. From 1564 onwards, she prioritised the construction of the new Tuileries Palace and the establishment of a large Renaissance garden.

Under Henry III of France, the Louvre became a space for royalty, a place of entertainment and the theater of historical events such as the marriage of the future King Henry IV of France with Margaret of Valois, which led to the St. Bartholomew's Day massacre in 1572.

During his reign, Henry IV destroyed the remaining elements on the south side, including the moat, in order to build the Grande galerie (Great Gallery in French) connecting the Louvre and the Tuileries. This was completed in 1610. He also began the construction of the Cour Carrée on the base of the existing Lescot wing. The surface was four times the size of the original medieval court. Some buildings between the two palaces were also destroyed. This project, named le Grand Dessein (the Grand Design in French), also had a military function by establishing a covered walkway between the Louvre and the Tuileries outside the city walls. Henry IV created this walkway in case he needed to flee on horseback during a riot.

In order to establish his power, on 24 April 1617 the young Louis XIII of France murdered Concino Concini, the favorite of his mother Marie de' Medici, at the entrance gate connecting the castle to the city.

Louis XIII demolished the northern part of the medieval enclosure in order to extend the Lescot wing in this direction, providing symmetry. The eastern part was demolished by Louis XIV of France to allow for the construction of the Louvre Colonnade.

Plans and reconstructions

Excavations and remains 

During the 19th century, it was found that the dungeon, along with two of the four walls were not completely demolished, but instead the stones from the walls were taken down to fill ditches in preparation for construction of the Louvre palace. Many people don't realize that the medieval Louvre included a dungeon, however there are remains on display at the Louvre.

During the construction of the Musée du Louvre, the bases of the keep and the two walls were cleared. A major excavation campaign resulted in the discovery of hundreds of everyday life objects. They are now accessible to the public in a collection named Medieval Louvre which features the lower room (today known as the Salle Saint-Louis) and the objects found during the excavations (small games, jugs, flasks, ...).

Notes

Bibliography
 Christ, Yvan (1949). Le Louvre et les Tuileries: Histoire architecturale d'un double palais. Paris: Éditions "Tel". .
Erlande-Brandenburg, Alain (1996). "Palais du Louvre", vol. 24, p. 161, in The Dictionary of Art, 34 volumes, edited by Jane Turner. New York: Grove. .
 Hanser, David A. (2006). Architecture of France. Westport, Connecticut: Greenwood Press. .
 Pérouse de Montclos, Jean-Marie, editor (1994). Le Guide du patrimoine Paris. Paris: Hachette. . .

External links

 http://www.francebalade.com/paris/louvre.htm 
 http://philippe-auguste.com/en/ville/louvre.html
 http://www.templedeparis.fr/2013/09/13/la-grosse-tour-premier-donjon-de-paris/ 
 http://www.richesheures.net/epoque-6-15/chateau/75louvre-description.htm 
 https://www.templedeparis.fr/2013/09/13/la-grosse-tour-premier-donjon-de-paris/ 

Louvre Palace
1202 establishments in Europe
1200s establishments in France
Louvre Castle
17th-century disestablishments in France
Buildings and structures in the 1st arrondissement of Paris
Buildings and structures completed in 1202
Houses completed in the 13th century
Buildings and structures demolished in the 17th century
Demolished buildings and structures in Paris
Ruined castles in Île-de-France
Palaces in Paris
Royal residences in France
Philip II of France